Veronika Kudermetova and Galina Voskoboeva were the defending champions but chose not to participate.

Georgina García Pérez and Sara Sorribes Tormo won the title, defeating Ekaterina Alexandrova and Oksana Kalashnikova in the final 6–2, 7–6(7–3).

Seeds

Draw

Draw

References

External Links
Main Draw

Open de Limoges - Doubles
Open de Limoges